The East Oregonian (EO) is a daily newspaper published in Pendleton, Oregon, United States and covering Umatilla and Morrow counties. The EO was the first-place winner of the Oregon Newspaper Publishers Association General Excellence award in 2011, 2012, 2013, 2015, 2016, 2017, 2018, 2019 and 2021.

History 
The newspaper was established in 1875 by M.P. Bull, as a weekly. In 1882, C. S. "Sam" Jackson purchased the EO. Within a year it had become a semiweekly, and in 1888, the paper was published every day except Sunday. Jackson went on to become the publisher of the Oregon Journal in Portland.

The newspaper is owned by EO Media Group, which prior to January 2013 was named the East Oregonian Publishing Company. The paper is published Tuesday through Saturday mornings. As of 2013, its circulation was 7,014; in 2020 it was 6,889. The paper maintains a bureau in Hermiston. The EO is the newspaper of record for Umatilla County.

References

External links
The East Oregonian (official website)

Further reading 
Gordon Macnab: A Century of News and People in the East Oregonian 1875-1975, East Oregonian Publishing Co., Pendleton, Oregon, 1975.



1875 establishments in Oregon
Newspapers published in Oregon
Oregon Newspaper Publishers Association
Pendleton, Oregon
Publications established in 1875